The XV Royal Bavarian Reserve Corps / XV Bavarian RK was a corps level command of the Royal Bavarian Army, part of the German Army, in World War I.

History 
The Corps was formed on 1 September 1914 as the temporary Corps Eberhardt, named for its commander General der Infanterie Magnus von Eberhardt, military governor of Strasbourg, then in the German Imperial territory of Alsace-Lorraine. On 1 December 1914, it was established as XV Reserve Corps and, on 1 September 1916, it was renamed as XV Bavarian Reserve Corps. It was still in existence at the end of the war in Armee-Abteilung A, Heeresgruppe Herzog Albrecht von Württemberg on the Western Front.

On 15 September 1914, Corps Eberhardt totalled 43 battalions, 6 squadrons, 30 batteries (172 guns) & 9 Pioneer companies. It was organized as follows:

On 10 December 1914, XV Reserve Corps was organized as follows:

Commanders 
Korps Eberhardt / XV Reserve Corps / XV Bavarian Reserve Corps had the following commanders during its existence:

See also 

Bavarian Army
30th Bavarian Reserve Division
39th Bavarian Reserve Division
XV Corps (German Empire)
German Army order of battle, Western Front (1918)

Notes

References

Bibliography 
 
 
 
 

Corps of Germany in World War I
Military units and formations of Bavaria
1914 establishments in Germany
1918 disestablishments in Germany
Military units and formations established in 1914
Military units and formations disestablished in 1918